Austin Hunter Johnson (born May 8, 1994) is an American football nose tackle for the Los Angeles Chargers of the National Football League (NFL). He played college football at Penn State, and was drafted by the Tennessee Titans in the second round of the 2016 NFL Draft.

Early life
Johnson was born in Galloway Township, New Jersey to parents Austin and Tammy Johnson, the third of four children – he has two older sisters and one younger sister. He attended St. Augustine Preparatory School in Richland, New Jersey with plans to play basketball in hopes of someday playing in college. He did play basketball, and earned all-state accolades his senior year. However, the football coach convinced him to try out for the football team, and he did. Subsequently, he was recruited by Penn State defensive line coach Larry Johnson, who convinced him not only to commit to Penn State, but to keep his commitment after crippling sanctions were announced in wake of the Penn State child sex abuse scandal, as well as the arrival of new coach Bill O'Brien.

College career
"An unheralded prep player from New Jersey who spent as much time on the basketball court as the football field," Johnson redshirted his freshman season, but entered training camp in 2013 eager to make an impact on the defensive line, establishing himself as a candidate to start opposite DaQuan Jones, Penn State's star defensive tackle that season. Mentored by Larry Johnson, Jones, and Jordan Hill, Austin Johnson proved himself early in the season, and earned a spot in the rotation at defensive tackle with Jones and Kyle Baublitz. At the conclusion of the 2013 season, he was named a member of the freshman all-conference teams by both ESPN.com, and the Big Ten Network.

Entering his redshirt sophomore season firmly established on the defensive line along with converted defensive end Anthony Zettel. He sought to "lead by example"; Penn State defensive coordinator Bob Shoop asserted that he was a consummate Penn State defensive tackle, drawing comparisons to Jones and Jack Crawford, among others. The Patriot News columnist Bob Flounders rated him among the most important components to Penn State's team entering the 2014 season. Early in the season, he did not compile many defensive statistics, but Penn State coach James Franklin commented, "[Johnson is] probably the most athletic 315-pound guy I've been around. The thing I like the most about him is every time I see him when he walks in the building or he's out at practice, he's got a huge smile on his face," going onto note that he has the ability to "wreck" an opponent's game. He has the ability to draw a double-team from opponents' offensive lines, which frees other defensive linemen, linebackers, and safeties to make plays at the line of scrimmage. Four games into Penn State's season, they had the best rush defense in the country, which Franklin attributed largely to the efforts of Johnson. He is majored in business administration at Penn State.

Professional career
Coming out of Penn State, the majority of scouts and analysts projected Johnson to be a second round pick. He was invited to the NFL Combine and was able to complete all the drills and positional workouts. Scouts and representatives from 31 NFL teams attended Penn State's pro day to evaluate Johnson, Christian Hackenberg, Jordan Lucas, Anthony Zettel, Carl Nassib, and eight other prospects. He chose to only perform positional drills. Johnson was ranked the ninth best defensive tackle by NFLDraftScout.com and ranked the 14th best defensive tackle (80th overall) by Sports Illustrated.

Tennessee Titans
The Tennessee Titans selected Johnson in the second round (43rd overall) of the 2016 NFL Draft. He was the sixth defensive tackle selected and the first of five Penn State players drafted.

On May 9, 2016, the Titans signed Johnson to a four-year, $5.66 million contract with $3.02 million guaranteed and a signing bonus of $2.31 million.

Johnson entered training camp competing for the starting nose tackle position with Al Woods and Antwaun Woods. He was named the backup nose tackle to veteran Al Woods to begin the regular season.

Johnson made his NFL debut in the Titans' season opener against the Minnesota Vikings and made one tackle in the 25–16 loss. During a Week 11 matchup against the Indianapolis Colts, he made two solo tackles and was credited with half a sack on Andrew Luck, as the Titans lost 24–17. On December 18, 2016, he made a season-high four combined tackles during a 19-17 road victory over the Kansas City Chiefs.

As a rookie in 2016, Johnson appeared in 10 games and finished with 15 tackles and a half-sack.

In the 2019 season, Johnson appeared in 16 games, starting one. He had 23 total tackles and no sacks for the first time in his career.

New York Giants
On March 30, 2020, Johnson was signed by the New York Giants.

In Week 4 against the Los Angeles Rams, Johnson recorded his first sack and forced fumble as a Giant during the 17–9 loss. 

On March 17, 2021, Johnson re-signed with the Giants. He started all 17 games, recording a career-high 72 tackles and 3.5 sacks.

Los Angeles Chargers
On March 16, 2022, Johnson signed a two-year, $14 million contract with the Los Angeles Chargers. He suffered a knee injury in Week 9 and was placed on injured reserve on November 9, 2022.

Personal Life
Johnson is married to former Lingerie Football League football league player Danika Brace

NFL statistics

Regular season

Postseason

References

External links
Penn State Biography
New York Giants bio

1994 births
Living people
American football defensive tackles
Los Angeles Chargers players
New York Giants players
Penn State Nittany Lions football players
Players of American football from New Jersey
People from Galloway Township, New Jersey
Sportspeople from Atlantic County, New Jersey
St. Augustine Preparatory School alumni
Tennessee Titans players